Mathieu Lemoine (born 17 April 1984) is a French Olympic equestrian. He represented his country at the 2016 Summer Olympics, where he won the gold medal in the team eventing and finished 15th individually with the horse Bart.

Lemoine also competed at the 2015 European Eventing Championships held at Blair Castle, where he won a team bronze.

References 

1984 births
Living people
French male equestrians
Equestrians at the 2016 Summer Olympics
Olympic equestrians of France
Olympic gold medalists for France
Olympic medalists in equestrian
Medalists at the 2016 Summer Olympics